The Caproni Bergamaschi AP.1 was an Italian monoplane attack aircraft designed by Cesare Pallavicino, coming from the Breda firm.

Design and development
Developed from the Ca.301, a single-seat fighter version of a similar design that was not put into production, the AP.1 was a two-seater version, fitted with a more powerful Alfa Romeo radial engine. Designed to serve both as a fighter and an attack aircraft, it was a low-wing monoplane with a fixed landing gear of mixed construction, having trouser-covered legs. Although it was a monoplane at a time when many of the air forces of the world were flying biplanes, the Caproni was still an anachronism with fixed landing gear (at that time, most new aircraft designs featured retractable landing gears).

The AP.1 prototype first flew on 27 April 1934. An initial series of 12 aircraft was delivered within 1936. In the same year, the Regia Aeronautica ordered a second series with improvements including a more powerful Alfa Romeo engine and more aerodynamic landing gear. In service, the large landing gear trousers were often removed for ease of maintenance.

Operational history
The Caproni AP.1 equipped a total of eight squadriglie (Italian air unit equivalent to half an RAF squadron) of the assault wings of the Regia Aeronautica. It took part in the Spanish Civil War, but its unsatisfactory performance led to its quick replacement with the Breda Ba.64, Ba.65 and Ba.88 types.

Four examples were purchased by El Salvador in 1938 for use in the Escuadrilla de Caza of the Salvadoran Air Force, in response to Honduras buying North American NA-16. A fifth aircraft was supplied for no additional cost to replace an aircraft which crashed during an air display by an Italian test pilot to celebrate delivery of the AP.1s. The AP-1s at first proved popular in service, and after El Salvador's entry into the Second World War in December 1941, were used to carry out anti-submarine patrols along El Salvador's coast. Shortage of spare parts for the aircraft's engines and damage to the wooden structure due to the tropical conditions and termites limited serviceability by mid-1943, and they were withdrawn from use in December 1944. In 1937, Paraguay placed an order for 22 AP.1s (18 landplanes and 4 floatplanes) as part of a re-equipment programme following the end of the Chaco War, but after the overthrow of Rafael Franco's government in August 1937 led to the order being cut to seven landplanes, with 10 landplanes and four floatplanes joining the Regia Aeronautica. Paraguay's AP.1s entered service in 1939, with three aircraft remaining in service during the Paraguayan Civil War in 1947, flying a few reconnaissance and ground attack missions against the rebel forces. They were withdrawn from use in 1949.

Variants

 Ca.301 - Two single-seat fighter prototypes
 Ca.305 - AP.1bis - Initial production version
 Ca.307 - Second production version
 Ca.308 - Seven aircraft sold to Paraguay

Operators
 : Regia Aeronautica
7° Gruppo (5° Stormo Assalto)
86° Squadriglia
98° Squadriglia
19° Gruppo (5° Stormo Assalto)
100° Squadriglia
102° Squadriglia
12° Gruppo (50° Stormo Assalto)
160° Squadriglia
165° Squadriglia
16° Gruppo (50° Stormo Assalto)
168° Squadriglia
169° Squadriglia
Aviazione Legionaria
 : Paraguayan Military Aviation
2° Escuadrilla de Caza
 : El Salvador Air Force
  : Spanish Air Force

Specifications

See also

References

 
 Taylor, Michael J.H. Jane's Encyclopedia of Aviation. London: Studio Editions, 1989.
 
 
 Sapienza Fracchia, Antonio Luis: "La Contribución Italiana en la Aviación Paraguaya". Author's edition. Asunción. 2007.

External links

 Caproni-Bergamasca Ca.301
 Caproni

A.P.1
1930s Italian attack aircraft
Low-wing aircraft
Single-engined tractor aircraft
Aircraft first flown in 1934